Khao Chamao - Khao Wong National Park, is a National Park in Khao Chamao District, Rayong Province in Thailand. The park covers an area of 52,300 rai ~  of forested mountains. North of the national park is the larger Khao Ang Rue Nai Wildlife Sanctuary.

Geography 
The Chamao-Wong Mountains forms a western outcrop of the much larger Cardamom Mountains, stretching east, well into Cambodia. Most of the mountain ridge is of moderate slope, reaching about 1,000 metres, but some hillside areas are quite steep. The most prominent peaks are Khao Chamao and Khao Wong, with Khao Chamao as the highest at about 1,024 meters above sea level.

Climate 
The weather of the National Park Khao chamao-Khao Wong is good. In the morning the weather is quite cold and is expected to be colder. During the day, the wind blows cold all day.

Flora and fauna 
Due to the close proximity to the much larger wildlife protection of Khao Ang Rue Nai Wildlife Sanctuary, the relatively small national park presents some larger and rare species that can only thrive in huge wilderness areas. This includes Asian elephant and Banteng. The park is also home to smaller mammals such as Barking deer, Sambar deer, Pileated gibbon and Crab-eating macaque.

A variety of birds are here too, including threatened and rare species. Of special note are Asian fairy-bluebird, Long-tailed broadbill, Great hornbill, Wreathed hornbill, Thick-billed pigeon, Mountain imperial pigeon, Blue pitta, Blue whistling thrush and Sulphur-breasted warbler.

Among reptiles, snakes such as King cobra, Reticulated python, Malayan pit viper and Malayan krait all lives here. Some of the gecko's living here, such as the Intermediate bent-toed gecko (Cyrtodactylus intermedius) or the Chanthaburi rock gecko (Cnemaspis chanthaburiensis), are endemic to this part of Southeast Asia. Along streams and pools, Green Water Dragons can sometimes be spotted. They are docile tree-living lizards, but are active during the day.

Waterfalls 

The mountains are known for its waterfalls, in particular the Khao Chamao waterfall originating from the peak of Chamao. This waterfall has 8 tiers with a downward flow of more than 3 kilometers. There is a path along the waterfall and it is possible to walk to the top and observe each tier, a hike that should take about two hours to complete. People always see the antimony fish in layer of waterfall.

Levels of waterfall:

1st level "Wang Nueng" (วังหนึ่ง)

2nd level "Wang Macha" (วังมัจฉา)

3rd level "Wang Morakot" (วังมรกต)

4th level "Wang Sai Ngam" (วังไทรงาม)

5th level "Pa Kluymai" (ผากล้วยไม้)

6th level "Chong-kab" (ช่องแคบ)

7th level "Hok-sai" (หกสาย)

8th level "High Cliff" (ผาสูง)

See also
List of national parks of Thailand
List of Protected Areas Regional Offices of Thailand

References

External links 

Khao Chamao - Khao Wong National Park

National parks of Thailand
Cardamom Mountains